Koli (also Romanized as Kolī; also known as Golī) is a village in Khanandabil-e Gharbi Rural District, in the Central District of Khalkhal County, Ardabil Province, Iran. At the 2006 census, its population was 518, in 134 families.

References 

Tageo

Towns and villages in Khalkhal County